Matthew Knowles (born 1985), known professionally as Matt William Knowles or Ma Tai, is an American actor known for his work in multiple Chinese films and television series such as Asura, Love Me If You Dare, Deng Xiao Ping at History's Crossroad, Red Sorghum, Eastern Battlefield and Red Star Over China.

Knowles plays the character of 'Rawa', a rebellious Demi-god, in the mythological fantasy, Asura. He also stars as 'Jet' in the action-thriller Bond of Justice.

In 2018, he was awarded best actor at the Canada China International Film Festival in Montreal, Canada for his role as Charles Harris in Poppies.

Career 

Knowles' entertainment career began when he was discovered singing Mandarin love songs in a Chinese karaoke hall and signed with a Chengdu, China agency. Shortly afterwards, he had a small role as a Viking Warrior in the 2013 film Vikingdom. In 2014, after graduating from Beijing Film Academy, Knowles guest starred on two Chinese shows, Red Sorghum and Deng Xiao Ping at History's Crossroads. Knowles hosted the 2014 Oscars virtual simulcast for Youku to China. In 2015, Knowles was seen in the recurring role of Dr. Barnes on Shanghai Media Group's drama Love Me If You Dare as well as the American pilot, Paul Tibbets in Eastern Battlefield. In 2016, he portrayed American Marine Corps General Evans Carlson on CCTV's period military drama Red Star Over China.

He starred as the mythical Demi-god, Rawa, next to Chinese star Leo Wu in Asura, a fantasy adventure film that was directed by Peng Zhang. Knowles also stars as the Japanese Yakuza mafia assassin, Jet, in Bond of Justice: Kizuna and as Charles Harris in a short film titled Poppies.

Filmography

Charity work 
In 2009, Knowles moved to China's impoverished Guizhou Province to do service work. Knowles lived in the town of Duyun where he taught English to over 1,500 students each week. During the weekends, he would run humanitarian projects in the surrounding mountains. Knowles is a supporter of autism awareness internationally through his support of Autism Speaks, Autism Guardian Angels, and the Lions Club International China. In December 2017, Matt returned to his childhood elementary school to give a motivational speech. In June 2018, Knowles became the 40th rotating mayor of Danzhai Wanda Village in Guizhou, China as part of their poverty alleviation program. In Danzhai, rotating mayors are chosen from a diverse field of non-political foreign applicants.

Personal life 
Knowles grew up in Greenville, South Carolina where he attended Sara Collins Elementary School. In 9th grade, he was cut from the C-team football team at J.L. Mann High School. In 2007, Knowles walked on to the Clemson Tigers Football team where he received the Most Improved Defensive Walk-on Award before a knee injury ended his football career. In 2008, Knowles graduated from Clemson University with a degree in Civil Engineering, and then moved to a poor region in China for humanitarian work. It was here that Knowles learned to speak fluent Mandarin Chinese. In 2013, Knowles earned a scholarship to the Beijing Film Academy, in which he became the school's first Caucasian student. In 2018, he graduated with a Master of Arts from the Theatre Lab program at the Royal Academy of Dramatic Art in London, England.

References

External links 

 
 

1985 births
Living people
21st-century American male actors
American male film actors
American expatriate actors
Alumni of RADA
American male television actors
American expatriates in China
Beijing Film Academy alumni
Clemson University alumni
American football defensive ends
Clemson Tigers football players
Male actors from South Carolina
People from Greenville, South Carolina